The Alcatel One Touch 980 (stylized as one touch 980 and commonly abbreviated as Alcatel OT-980) is a touchscreen slider smartphone manufactured by TCL Communication. The phone was announced on February 15, 2010 at the Mobile World Congress. The Alcatel One Touch 980 was the first Alcatel to run the Android operating system, running version 2.1 "Éclair". The phone has been noted to resemble the Palm Prē.

Reception
The One Touch 980 has been met with mixed reviews. CNET UK awarded the phone 2.5 out of 5 stars, praising the phone for its budget price, QWERTY keyboard and decent performance but criticizing the screen sensitivity and how outdated the user interface felt.
TechRadar gave the phone 3 out of 5 stars, praising its battery life but criticizing the camera and the phone's thickness.

References

External links
Official product page
Official support page, includes the user manual
XDA Developers post on installing unofficial Froyo
XDA Developers post on installing unofficial Gingerbread

Android (operating system) devices
Alcatel mobile phones
Mobile phones introduced in 2010